Damien Piqueras (born 29 August 1991) is a French lightweight rower. He won a gold medal at the 2017 World Rowing Championships in Sarasota, Florida with the lightweight men's quadruple scull.

References

1991 births
Living people
French male rowers
World Rowing Championships medalists for France
Université Savoie-Mont Blanc alumni